Catenulispora graminis is a bacterium from the genus of Catenulispora which has been isolated from rizopheric soil from the bamboo Phyllostachys nigro var. henonis from Damyang in Korea.

References

Actinomycetia
Bacteria described in 2012